The Buffalo area economy consists of a mix of industrial, light manufacturing, high technology, and service-oriented private sector companies. Instead of relying on a single industry or sector for its economic future, the region has taken a diversified approach that has the potential to create opportunities for growth and expansion in the 21st century.

History
Buffalo and the surrounding area were long involved in railroad commerce, steel manufacture, automobile production, aircraft/aerospace design and production, Great Lakes shipping and grain storage. Most of these industries have left the city through the years. Major steel production no longer exists in the area, although several smaller steel mills remains in operation. As of the 1950 United States Census, Buffalo was the 15th largest city in the country, the nation's largest inland port (12th overall), second biggest rail center, sixth largest steel producer, and eighth largest manufacturer.

Employment
Overall, employment in Buffalo has shifted as its population has declined and manufacturing has diminished. Buffalo's 2005 unemployment rate was 6.6%, contrasted with New York State's 5.0% rate. And from the fourth quarter of 2005 to the fourth quarter of 2006, Erie County had no net job growth, ranking it 271st among the 326 largest counties in the country. Yet the area has recently seen an upswing in job growth as unemployment has dropped to only 4.9% in July 2007 from 5.2% in 2006 and 6.6% in 2005. The area's manufacturing jobs have continued to show the largest losses in jobs with over 17,000 fewer than at the start of 2006. Yet other sectors of the economy have outdistanced manufacturing and are seeing large increases. Educational and health services added over 30,400 jobs in 2006 and over 20,500 jobs have been added in the professional and business (mostly finance) arena.

Life sciences
Buffalo has increasingly become a center for bioinformatics and human genome research, including work by researchers at the University at Buffalo and Roswell Park Comprehensive Cancer Center. This consortium is known as the Buffalo Niagara Medical Campus. It also includes: Buffalo Hearing & Speech Center, Buffalo Medical Group Foundation, Hauptman-Woodward Medical Research Institute, Kaleida Health, Olmsted Center for the Visually Impaired, Cleveland BioLabs and Upstate New York Transplant Services. The DNA samples used in The Human Genome Project were also collected from anonymous donors from Buffalo.

Entrepreneurial resources and life science business consultants accelerate the growth and development of emerging companies found within the Buffalo Niagara Medical Campus and Upstate New York Region. For example, Buffalo BioSciences is a technology commercialization partner to the New York State Center of Excellence in Bioinformatics & Life Sciences and contributed to the launch and early success of Empire Genomics –- a firm based on research conducted at Roswell Park Comprehensive Cancer Center by Dr. Norma Nowak enabling the delivery of personalized medicine.

Banking

Buffalo is the headquarters of M&T Bank, a large regional bank with assets over $79B (as of June 2011). Its rival Marine Midland Bank operated for decades from downtown Buffalo before being acquired by HSBC and being rebranded as HSBC Bank USA. HSBC has reduced its local operations in Buffalo, and Upstate NY as a whole, as it closed its retail banking centers. Many of the shuttered HSBC retail banking centers in upstate were acquired by First Niagara Bank (see below). Other banks, such as Bank of America and KeyBank have corporate operations in Buffalo, the latter expanding its own operations after acquiring First Niagara. Citigroup also has regional offices in Amherst, Buffalo's largest suburb. Buffalo has also become a hub of the debt collection industry.

First Niagara Bank had recently moved its headquarters to downtown Buffalo from nearby Lockport. It had branches from Buffalo to Albany, New York, and since September 2009 has had branches as far south as Pittsburgh. On September 10, 2009, First Niagara announced the relocation of its corporate headquarters from Lockport to downtown Buffalo. First Niagara, which had been considering expanding into Western Pennsylvania for some time, benefited from PNC Financial Services being required by the United States Department of Justice to sell off 50 National City branches in the Pittsburgh area and 11 more branches in and around Erie to competitors, since the two banks had significant overlap in Western Pennsylvania and had potential antitrust issues in that area. First Niagara took advantage by buying 57 of the 61 National City branches from PNC that had to be divested after PNC acquired National City with funds from the $700 billion bailout plan after National City became a victim of the subprime mortgage crisis. The move affected the area by creating 200 more jobs, some in the Buffalo area. On July 31, 2011, it was announced First Niagara had acquired all of HSBC Banks Western New York branches; after closing and selling some branches to its competitors its total number in Upstate New York had almost doubled. In 2015, First Niagara was acquired by KeyBank.

Other

Buffalo is home to Rich Products, one of the world's largest family-owned food manufacturers. Canadian brewer Labatt moved its US headquarters to Buffalo in May 2007. This is in large part due to Buffalo's location directly in the middle of the Northeastern Trade Corridor. The city is the heart of the Canadian-American corridor. Over 80% of all U.S.-Canada trade occurs via border crossings in the eastern United States and with five bridges to Canada, the Buffalo area is one of the key eastern border crossing locations. Cheese company Sorrento Lactalis is also based in Buffalo. General Mills has a cereal mill in the city, and Tops Friendly Markets, a regional supermarket chain, remains headquartered in nearby Williamsville. Delaware North is also headquartered in Buffalo, having built a new building in downtown recently. Del Monte Foods' Milk Bone dog biscuits are still manufactured in a small factory on the city's East Side.

New Era Cap Company, the largest sports-licensed headwear company in the United States, is based in Buffalo. It opened new headquarters in 2007 in the former Federal Reserve Building in downtown Buffalo.

The windshield wiper maker Trico, founded in Buffalo by John R. Oishei, operated three major manufacturing facilities but has since closed all of them and moved operations to Mexico. In 1998, the company head office moved to Rochester Hills, Michigan. Trico's Plant No. 1 was placed on the National Register of Historic Places in 2001 and in 2014 was being re-developed by the State University of New York at Buffalo.  The John R. Oishei Foundation is western New York's largest and the new Women's & Children's Hospital, scheduled to open in 2015, will be named the John R. Oishei Children's Hospital.

For many years, Buffalo was the nation's second largest rail center, after Chicago. Peaked traffic reached during World War II, but declined soon after the war. Through the 1960s and 1970s freight traffic via Buffalo declined, air travel and the New York State Thruway took railway passengers away as well. By 1980, the rail hub in the city was gone.

Regionally based insurance companies also have maintained their headquarters in Buffalo, New York. There's Merchants Insurance Group and Lawley Insurance. Merchants Insurance Group is a property and casualty insurance company that provides commercial, personal property and casualty insurance throughout the Northeast and North Central United States. Lawley Insurance provides commercial insurance, employee benefits, risk management and personal insurance.

Some industry remains in Buffalo and its surrounding area in the 21st Century. Ford maintains a stamping plant in South Buffalo. General Motors also runs the Tonawanda Engine plant by the Niagara River, and there are additional chemical and technology companies that continue to operate factories throughout the city and region. In addition, Tesla has partnered with Panasonic and New York State to operate Gigafactory 2 on the former Republic Steel site. The facility, which opened in 2017, manufactures photovoltaic modules for Tesla's SolarCity subsidiary and will gradually phase into manufacturing individual solar cells. It is the largest facility of its type in the Western Hemisphere. The current incarnation of Republic Steel still maintains a facility in nearby Blasdell.

43 North is a venture capital startup competition funded from the Buffalo Billion program. It awards $5 million to its winners each year, and also offers them mentorship, workspace in the Buffalo Niagara Medical Campus, and tax incentives from the state of New York, among other benefits.

Standard of living
The loss of traditional jobs in manufacturing, rapid suburbanization and high costs of labor have led to economic decline, making Buffalo one of the poorest among U.S. cities with populations of more than 250,000 people. An estimated 28.7–29.9% of Buffalo residents live below the poverty line, behind either only Detroit, or only Detroit and Cleveland.<ref>Buffalo 3rd Poorest Large City . WGRZ TV. Retrieved October 14, 2008.</ref> Buffalo's median household income of $27,850 is third-lowest among large cities, behind only Miami and Cleveland; however the median household income for the metropolitan area is $57,000.

This, in part, has led to the Buffalo-Niagara Falls metropolitan area having the most affordable housing market in the U.S. today. The quarterly NAHB/Wells Fargo Housing Opportunity Index (HOI) noted that nearly 90% of the new and existing homes sold in the metropolitan area during the second quarter were affordable to families making the area's median income of $57,000. The area median price of homes was $75,000.

Buffalo faces issues with vacant and abandoned houses, as the city ranks second to St. Louis on the list of American cities with the most vacant properties per capita. Since 2000, the city has torn down 2,000 vacant homes but as many as 10,000 still remain. Mayor Byron W. Brown recently unveiled a $100 million, five-year plan to demolish 5,000 more houses. The city's move away from heavy industry and toward a service and bioinformatics economy  has brought improved air and water quality, which benefit not only residents and tourists but the bioregion as a whole. In July 2005, Reader's Digest'' ranked Buffalo as the third cleanest large city in the nation.

Buffalo's economy has begun to see significant improvements since the early 2010s. Money from state governor Andrew Cuomo, plans for different construction programs, and hundreds of new jobs have brought strong economic change to the area.

Principal employers
According to the City's 2019 Comprehensive Annual Financial Report, the principal employers in the Buffalo Metropolitan Area are:

Major companies located in the Buffalo Niagara metro area
This is an incomplete list of notable companies with major operations or headquarters in Buffalo or within the surrounding area.

References:

Alfred State College
Alfred University
Astronics Corporation
Aurubis
Bank of America
Blue Cross Blue Shield (Western NY headquarters)
The Buffalo News in Canalside
Computer Task Group
University at Buffalo
Canisius College
Catholic Health
Charter Communications
Citigroup
Cummins
Cutco in Olean (headquarters)
Delaware North in downtown (headquarters)
Dresser-Rand Group
DuPont
Ellicott Development Co.
Empire Genomics (headquarters)
Fisher-Price in East Aurora
Ford Motor Company (Buffalo Stamping Plant)
GEICO in Amherst
General Mills in Canalside
General Motors (Tonawanda Engine)
HSBC Bank USA in downtown
Ingram Micro
Kaleida Health
Keybank in Larkinville
Labatt Brewing Company in downtown (U.S. headquarters)

Life Storage in Williamsville, NY
Linde
Mighty Taco
Moog Inc. in East Aurora (headquarters)
M&T Bank in downtown (headquarters)
New Era Cap Company in downtown (headquarters)
National Fuel Gas in Williamsville (headquarters)
Nestlé Purina PetCare
Niagara Falls Memorial Medical Center in Niagara Falls
Niagara University in Lewiston
NOCO Energy Corporation in Tonawanda (headquarters)
OnCore Golf (headquarters)
Pegula Sports and Entertainment in Canalside (headquarters)
People Inc.
Perry's Ice Cream
Rich Products (headquarters)
Republic Steel in Blasdell
Roswell Park Comprehensive Cancer Center
Seneca Gaming Corp 
Seneca Niagara Casino
Seneca Buffalo Creek Casino
Seneca Allegany Casino
Saint-Gobain Corp.
Solar Liberty
Sumitomo Rubber USA LLC
Synacor (headquarters)
Tesla, Inc./SolarCity in South Buffalo (Gigafactory 2)
Tops Markets in Williamsville (headquarters)
Univera Healthcare
Wegmans

References